The 1826 Massachusetts gubernatorial election was held on April 3.

Governor Levi Lincoln Jr., an Adams Republican, was re-elected to a second term over fractured opposition from the state's Federalists. This was the last party in which candidates stood as Federalists, as the party had been on the verge of collapse for years. The state soon coalesced into a dominant Adams Republican faction with a minority Jacksonian Republican group.

General election

Candidates
Levi Lincoln Jr., incumbent Governor since 1825 (Adams Republican)
James Lloyd, U.S. Senator since 1822 (Federalist)
Samuel Hubbard (Federalist)
William Sullivan (Federalist)

Results

Notes

References

Governor
1826
Massachusetts
November 1826 events